Sweet Dreams is a 2016 Italian film directed by Marco Bellocchio. It is based on the novel Sweet Dreams, Little One by Massimo Gramellini. It was screened in the Directors' Fortnight section at the 2016 Cannes Film Festival.

Cast
 Bérénice Bejo
 Valerio Mastandrea
 Fabrizio Gifuni
 Guido Caprino
 Barbara Ronchi
 Emmanuelle Devos
 Miriam Leone
 Francesco Scianna
 Linda Messerklinger

Production
The screenplay is based on Massimo Gramellini's 2012 novel Sweet Dreams, Little One. The film was produced by IBC Movie, Kavac Film, Rai Cinema and Advitam. It received 800,000 euro in support from the Ministry of Cultural Heritage and Activities and Tourism. The full budget was five million euro.

The film was shot in Turin. Filming began on 4 May 2015 and lasted eight weeks.

See also    
 List of Italian films of 2016

References

External links

2016 films
2010s Italian-language films
Italian biographical drama films
2016 biographical drama films
Films based on Italian novels
Films based on biographies
Biographical films about journalists
Films shot in Italy
Films set in Turin
Films set in the 1970s
Films set in the 1990s
Films directed by Marco Bellocchio
2016 drama films
2010s Italian films